is a Japanese manga series written and illustrated by Hitsuji Gondaira. It has been serialized in Shueisha's Weekly Shōnen Jump magazine since August 2019, with its chapters collected in sixteen tankōbon volumes as of January 2023. An anime television series adaptation by Silver Link is set to premiere in 2024.

Plot
The series follows Taiyo Asano, a boy who lost his family in a car crash. His childhood friend, Mutsumi Yozakura, is his only comfort in life. However, things change for Taiyo again, when he discovers that his teacher is not only the older brother of Mutsumi, but she also comes from a family of spies. After a fight involving the Yozakura family, Taiyo becomes Mutsumi's husband, and in order to protect her, he must become a spy himself.

Characters

The main protagonist of the series. He is also the husband of Mutsumi. He is very kind and compassionate, which is very surprising in the world of Spies. Originally an ordinary human, his training to be a spy has caused him to become superhuman. He specializes in using Yae, a revolver that fires electricity instead of bullets, and can transform into a katana. After Mutsumi gives him some of her blood, he gains abilities of the Yozakura family, including the ability of "Blooming". His Blooming ability allows him to harden his body. His signature color is red.

The main heroine of the series. She is the wife of Taiyo. She is sweet, loving and responsible, she is the tenth head of the Yozakura family. Although she has no special abilities like her siblings, she is the only one capable of producing the next generation of Yozakura spies due to her ability to produce the Someinine that gives the family their abilities. Her signature color is blue.

The eldest sibling of the Yozakura Family. He is very overprotective of Mutsumi, to the point of having a complex. He is willing to torture and murder others to protect her, which results in him having an antagonistic relationship with Taiyo. He uses weapon called Steel Spider, a large amount of steel thread he can manipulate at will. His signature color is black.

The second sibling of the Yozakura Family. Despite being somewhat violent and strict, she is actually very caring and motherly. She specializes in martial arts, specifically aikido and jujitsu, and can use said martial arts to control wind. Her Blooming ability allows her to engulf and nullify attacks. Her signature color is white.

The third sibling of the Yozakura Family. He has a glass heart and easily embarrassed, but very caring. He is a weapon specialist, capable of using almost any weapon he can get his hands on, and can even craft his own, his most powerful being a shapeshifting alloy called "Turmeric". His Blooming ability allows him to see how to destroy anything. His signature color is green.

The forth sibling of the Yozakura Family. She is somewhat nonchalant, but also aggressive and competitive. She is a hacking specialist, and can even create programs in the form of video games. Her blooming ability allows her to read data at the speed of a supercomputer. Her signature color is magenta.

The fifth sibling of the Yozakura Family. He is a free spirit, and would rather do fun things then work. He also cares a lot about his appearance, specifically his skin. He can disguise himself as anyone and mimic their voice perfectly, making him a espionage specialist. His blooming ability allows him to completely understand everything about his opponent. His signature color is yellow.

The youngest sibling of the Yozakura Family. He is the kindest of the siblings, although he has a unintentional dark side. He is a medical genius, able to create multiple drugs, for lethal intentions, or for healing. He is a mutant as a result of multiple experiments, although he can alter his shape to a more human form. His blooming ability allows him to detoxify any poison. His signature color is turquoise.

The family guard dog. He is a Okami dog, and has guarded the family for generations. He is able to alter his size at will.

A girl placed under the care of the Yozakura Family after the lose of her guardian. A former leader of Tanpopo, she had her DNA mixed with an Okami Dog, granting them her abilities. Taiyo and Mutsumi see her as their daughter.

Media

Manga
Mission: Yozakura Family, written and illustrated by Hitsuji Gondaira, started in Shueisha's Weekly Shōnen Jump on August 26, 2019. Shueisha has compiled its chapters into individual tankōbon volumes. The first volume was published on February 4, 2020. As of January 4, 2023, sixteen volumes have been published.

Viz Media publishes the manga digitally in English on its Shonen Jump website. Shueisha also simultaneously publishes the series in English for free on the Manga Plus app and website. Viz Media started releasing the volumes in print on October 18, 2022.

The manga is also licensed in France by Kana.

Volume list

Chapters not yet in tankōbon format
These chapters have yet to be published in a tankōbon volume. They were originally serialized in Japanese in issues of Shueisha's magazine Weekly Shōnen Jump and its English digital version published by Viz Media and in Manga Plus by Shueisha.

Anime
On December 17, 2022, it was announced that the series will be adapted into an anime television series by Silver Link. It is set to premiere in 2024.

Novel
In October 2022, as part of the manga series' third anniversary, it was announced that it would receive a novel adaptation.

Reception
By December 2022, the manga had over 1.5 million copies in circulation. In 2020, the manga was nominated for the sixth Next Manga Awards.

References

External links
 
 

Anime series based on manga
Espionage in anime and manga
Romantic comedy anime and manga
Shōnen manga
Shueisha manga
Silver Link
Thriller anime and manga
Viz Media manga